{{Infobox person
| name = Bosco Wong
| image = 黃宗澤現身公開活動.jpg
| alt = 
| caption = Wong in June 2020
| birth_date = 
| birth_place = British Hong Kong
| occupation = 
| years_active = 1998–present
| awards = Europe China Image Film Festival for Best Leading Actor2014 Golden Brother 
| website =
| module2 = 
| module = 
}}

Bosco Wong Chung-chak (born 13 December 1980) is a Hong Kong actor, singer, and entrepreneur who gained popularity in the modern drama Triumph in the Skies (2003). Since then, he has played a diverse spectrum of roles in television series such as Wars of In-laws (2005), Dicey Business (2006) Lives of Omission (2011), and the Flying Tiger franchise. In 2014, Wong won Best Actor at the China Image Film Festival for his performance in Golden Brother. 

Wong also owns Oystermine, a restaurant located in Hong Kong.

Acting career 

 1998–2005: Early career and breakthrough 
In 1998, Wong was spotted on the street by a talent scout and filmed a lemon tea commercial. Recruiters offered him further opportunities but Wong insisted on finishing his high school first. After graduating from secondary school, Wong joined broadcasting network TVB in 1999 at age 19. Wong hosted various variety programs and played an extra in various drama series.

Wong made his official acting debut in Burning Flame II (2002). He was subsequently cast in historical series Find The Light, and coming-of-age drama Aqua Heroes. He gained popularity as the pilot trainee Chris in the 2003 blockbuster Triumph in the Skies. He then starred as the titular character in the period action drama Wong Fei Hung - Master of Kung Fu in 2004. In 2005, he starred alongside Liza Wang and Myolie Wu in the costume comedy Wars of In-Laws,  He won the TVB Award for Most Improved Actor that year.

 2006–2017: Mainstream success 
Wong's performance as a socially inept youth in Dicey Business (2006) earned him more popularity and recognition as a rising actor. He made his film debut in the 2008 film The Luckiest Man. In 2011, he starred as the triad leader "Bai Co" or "Cripple Co" in Lives of Omission (2011). He expressed that his older age allows him to play more mature characters such as triad leader "Crippled Co" and righteous police Inspector Hui in Witness Insecurity (2012) and "Crippled Co" is a role that he had fun playing.

Wong was cast as Chiu Bing in director Fire Lee's debut movie Love In Time (2012) and gained positive applause for his sincere and realistic performance. He received positive reviews for his performance as the central character Sit Ho Ching in Golden Brother. which subsequently won him Best Leading Actor award at the 2014 China Image Film Festival.

Wong starred Di Renjie in the Gong'an drama Young Sherlock (2014).

Wong starred in the 2016 drama series Two Steps From Heaven, alongside Priscilla Wong, Edwin Siu, and Louis Cheng. He portrays Sheldon Chun, a public relations director who, in hopes of climbing the social ladder, becomes ruthless.

In December 2016, Wong announced he will not be renewing his management contract with TVB, ending his 17-year career at the station. His last TVB drama was Heart of Greed 3. 2018–present: Shaw Brothers 
Wong joined Shaw Brothers Studio in 2017. He starred in the action crime drama series Flying Tiger and Guardian Angel. In December 2018, During the filming of Flying Tiger 2, Wong was injured during an action scene, suffering a fracture in his left foot. He underwent surgery and was hospitalized for five days. He resumed filming in January and used a stunt double for the rest of his action scenes. Wong began filming the web drama series White War in April 2019, in which he portrays an undercover cop. Wong began filming for the third installment of the Flying Tiger franchise in July 2020.

 Singing career 
In October 2008, Bosco signed a record deal with East Asia Music and released his debut EP in December of the same year.

 Personal life 
Wong began dating War of In-laws co-star Myolie Wu in 2005. On July 25, 2012, Wong announced that the two had split. In 2014, Wong began dating model Vanessa Yeung. The two were seen together on a date on February 3. The couple broke up later that year.

Filmography

Film

Television series

Mainland chinese

Hong Kong TVB

Shaw Brothers

Programme host
2016 - Summer Sweetie 夏日甜心
2011 - Water of Life 水之源 (Won: 2011 TVB Anniversary Awards Best Informative Programme)  
2009 - Wine Confidential'' 尋味葡萄 
2000~2002 - 非常音乐空间 
2001~2002 - 欢乐今宵 
2000~2001 - 和你玩得喜 
2001 - 世纪狂欢飞跃  
2000 - 中国奥运金牌选手龙的光辉大汇演   
2000 - 英皇超新星大赛 
2000 - TVB.com 直check电视城 
2000 - 永安旅游话系知点解海南岛咁好玩

Music video appearances

Discography

Album
2008 - Debut EP: In Love with Bosco (Release date: Dec 5, 2008)
2010 - EP: Bravo (Release date: June 3, 2010).

Soundtrack

TVB series Theme song and subtheme

TVB children song

Others

Awards

2005
2005 Children's Song Awards: Top Ten Children’s Songs, “Legend of Na Ja” 	
2005 38th TVB Anniversary: Most Improved Actor Award, Ling Mau Chun in Wars of In-Laws

2006
2006 Metro ShowBiz TV Awards: Most Popular Male Actor 	
2006 Next Magazine TV Awards: Top Ten TV Artistes - 3rd Place
2006 Next Magazine TV Awards: Happy Shop Most Energetic Artiste
2006 TVB Popularity Awards: Top Ten Most Popular TV Character, Ling Mau Chun in Wars of In-Laws	
2006 TVB Popularity Awards: Most Popular On-Screen Couple - Bosco Wong and Myolie Wu 	
2006 TVB Popularity Awards: Predige Best Skin Award
2006 Annual Artiste Award: Best TV Actor Award - Bronze
2006 Astro TV Drama Award: Top 12 Favorite Character Award, as Ling Mau Chun in Wars of In-Laws 	
2006 Astro TV Drama Award: Most Bizarre Character Award, as 'knitting' Ling Mau Chun in Wars of In-Laws

2007
2007 Next Magazine TV Awards: Top Ten TV Artistes - 6th Place
2007 Children's Song Awards: Top Ten Children’s Songs, “Keroro Again” 	
2007 Esquire Magazine Awards: Most Promising Star
2007 Yahoo Popularity Awards: Most Searched Rising-Popularity Artiste
2007 Astro TV Drama Award: Top 12 Favorite Character Award, as Kuen Lik in Under the Canopy of Love

2008
2008 Next Magazine TV Awards: Top Ten TV Artistes - 7th Place
2008 Yahoo Popularity Awards:
2008 HIM Magazine Awards: Cover Award
2008 Metro Hits Awards: Newcomer with Potential
2008 JSG Awards: Most Popular Male Newcomer - Silver
2008 Sina Music Awards: Most Favourite Male Newcomer - Gold
2008 Astro TV Drama Award: Top 12 Favorite Character Award, as Lui To in The Price of Greed

2009
2009 15th Shanghai TV Festival: Most Potential Actor Award, William Shek Tai Chuen in The Gem of Life
2009 IFPI Award: Top Album Sales(Male Newcomer)

2010
2010 Next Magazine TV Awards: Top Ten TV Artistes - 7th Place

2011
2011 Next Magazine TV Awards: Top Ten TV Artistes - 7th Place
2011 Singapore Starhub TVB Awards: Top 5 My Favorite TVB Male TV Character, as Chung Lam Dai in Growing Through Life
2011 HKFDA Fashion Visionaries Award: Top 10
2011 Astro On Demand Favourite Award: Top 15 Favorite Character Award, as Michael So Sing Pak/Bai Co in Lives of Omission

2012
2012 Next Magazine TV Awards: Top Ten TV Artistes - 6th Place
2012 Singapore Starhub TVB Awards: Top 6 My Favorite TVB Male TV Character, as Michael So Sing Pak/Bai Co in Lives of Omission
2012 Astro On Demand Awards: Top 15 Favorite Character Award, as Hui Wai Sam/Hui Sir in Witness Insecurity
2012 Esquire(China) Men at His Best Award: Most Popular HK/Taiwan Artiste

2013
2013 Singapore Starhub TVB Awards: My Favorite TVB Actor
2013 Singapore Starhub TVB Awards: Top 6 My Favorite TVB Male TV Character, as Hui Wai Sam in Witness Insecurity
2013 Singapore Starhub TVB Awards: My Favourite Onscreen Couple in A Change of Heart with Niki Chow
2013 Astro On Demand TVB Stars Award: Top 15 Favorite Character Award, as Yiu Yat San & Yiu Yuet San in A Change of Heart

2014
2014 Singapore Starhub TVB Awards: Top 6 My Favorite TVB Male TV Character, as Cheuk Yuk in The Ultimate Addiction
2014 Astro On Demand TVB Stars Award: Top 15 Favorite Character Award, as Cheuk Yuk in The Ultimate Addiction
Europe China Image Film Festival 2014:Best Leading Actor as Sit Ho Ching in Golden Brother
2014 47th TVB Anniversary Award:TVBC Most Popular Actor in Mainland China Award

References

External links

 
 
Bosco Wong at Sina microblog

1980 births
Living people
Hong Kong male film actors
Hong Kong male television actors
21st-century Hong Kong male actors
20th-century Hong Kong male actors
21st-century Hong Kong male singers
Hong Kong male singers